Mount Brooks could mean:

 Mount Brooks (Alaska), a peak of the Alaska Range northeast of Mount McKinley (Denali)
 Mount Brooks (British Columbia), a peak in Strathcona Provincial Park